Cërmjan (definite Albanian: Cërmjani) is a village in the Gjakova municipality of Kosovo. It is located in the Dushkajë subregion of Dukagjin and has 1,141 inhabitants as of 2011. Suka e Cërmjanit, a location in the northern part of the region is the site of fortification walls of a settlement of late antiquity in a total surface area of ca. 1.3 ha.

References and Notes

Sources

Villages in Gjakova